Kasipatnam is a major panchayathi village of Makkuva Mandalam, Vizianagaram district of Andhra Pradesh state pin 535547, India. It has a population of around 2000.

References
Villages in Vizianagaram district